Ratkal is a village  in the Indian state of Karnataka, India. It is located in Chincholi taluk of Kalburgi district.

Demographics
 India census, Ratkal had a population of 4759 with 2346 males and 2413 females.

Education Institutions
The school in Ratkal are
Government higher primary school Ratkal.
Government high school Ratkal.

Economy
Agriculture is the primary occupation in Ratkal, major Crops produce in Ratkal are Pigeon pea, Sorghum, Pearl millet, chickpea, mung bean, vigna mungo.

Transport
Bus
A KSRTC bus facility is available to travel within the Karnataka state and Nabor states.
Rail
Kalaburagi railway station is the nearest station to Ratkal.
Airport
Rajiv Gandhi International Airport Hyderabad is near to Ratkal.

References

Villages in Kalaburagi district